Republic Day is a public holiday in Turkey commemorating the proclamation of the Republic of Turkey, on 29 October 1923. The annual celebrations start at 1:00 pm on 28 October and continue for 35 hours.

Background
The holiday commemorates the events of 29 October 1923, when Mustafa Kemal Atatürk declared that Turkey was henceforth a republic. Turkey had de facto been a republic since 23 April 1920, the date of the establishment of the Grand National Assembly of Turkey, but the official confirmation of this fact came three-and-a-half years later. On 29 October 1923, the status of the nation as a republic was declared and its official name was proclaimed to be  ("the Republic of Turkey"). After that, a vote was held in the Grand National Assembly, and Atatürk was elected as the first President of the Republic of Turkey.

Customs
Republic Day is a national holiday marked by patriotic displays. Similar to other autumn events, Republic Day celebrations often take place outdoors. According to Law No. 2429 of 1981, Republic Day is a national holiday, so all public institutions are closed on that day. It is also observed by Northern Cyprus.

Decorations (e.g., streamers, balloons, and clothing) are generally colored red and white, the colors of the Turkish flag. Anıtkabir is visited by more than a hundred thousand people every year. Parades are often held in the morning, while concerts, and fireworks displays occur in the evening after dark at such places as parks, fairgrounds, or town squares. Republic Day fireworks are often accompanied by patriotic songs such as the 10th Anniversary March. Istanbul has the largest fireworks display in the country. It generally holds displays over the Bosporus. Other major displays are in Ankara in Ulus; and in İzmir over the Gulf of İzmir and Gündoğdu Square.

Tenth Year Speech 
The tenth year speech was the speech given by the President of the Republic of Turkey, Mustafa Kemal Atatürk, at the celebrations of the tenth anniversary of the republic's establishment. This was a speech that not only gives an account of the Turkish War of Independence, in other words, tells about whom, why and how the national struggle was waged, but also contains important information about what should be done and what will be done in the phase of this struggle after the establishment of the Republic.

Celebration gallery

References

External links

Thirty poems that highlight the beauty and virtues of Republic Day. in muallimce (Teaching Language). 

Remembrance days
Turkey
Public holidays in Turkey
Public holidays in Northern Cyprus
October observances
Autumn events in Turkey